J-bomb may refer to:

Jean-Paul LeBlanc (born 1946), retired professional ice hockey player

weapon in the video game Blast Corps